is a Japanese actress who rose to fame for her role in the indie film One Cut of the Dead. She is represented by her agency Asobi System.

Career

She entered the industry as a junior idol under the stage name Yuzuki Hashimoto in 2008. From 2010 and onward, her focus changed to theatre, reprising various roles on stage. She changed her stage name to Yuzuki Akiyama in 2012 and joined various theatre groups without major success in her career.

In 2017, she starred in the indie zombie comedy film One Cut of the Dead, which was a major hit in Japan, and sparked an international cult following as well. The film made her famous and she was signed by Asobi System. Since then, Akiyama has had a number of commercial, theatre and television appearances.

References

External links
 Yuzuki Akiyama Official Profile - ASOBISYSTEM
 
 

21st-century Japanese actresses
Living people
1993 births
People from Saitama Prefecture